Strmec is a small village in the hills south of Velike Lašče in central Slovenia. With the rest of the Municipality of Velike Lašče it is part of the traditional region of Lower Carniola and is now included in the Central Slovenia Statistical Region.

References

External links
Strmec on Geopedia

Populated places in the Municipality of Velike Lašče